Liverpool Toxteth was a borough constituency represented in the House of Commons of the Parliament of the United Kingdom. It elected one Member of Parliament (MP) by the first past the post system of election.

Boundaries 
The constituency was named after the Toxteth district, in the south inner-city area of Liverpool. The city is in the south west of the historic county of Lancashire. It is now part of the Metropolitan county of Merseyside and the North West of England region.

The constituency was created from the 1950 United Kingdom general election. It included parts of the former Liverpool East Toxteth and Liverpool West Toxteth constituencies.

The constituency comprised the following wards of Liverpool.
 1950–1955: Dingle, Princes Park, Sefton Park East, and Sefton Park West. Dingle and Princes Park had formed part of the old West Toxteth division, whilst the two Sefton Park wards were transferred from the old East Toxteth.
 1955–1974: Arundel, Dingle, Princes Park, and St Michael's.
 1974–1983: Arundel, Dingle, Granby, Princes Park, and St Michael's.

From the 1983 United Kingdom general election the constituency was abolished. Its territory contributed 53.1% of the new constituency of Liverpool Riverside and 8.6% of Liverpool Mossley Hill. Liverpool Riverside broadly combined the old Scotland Exchange and Toxteth divisions. Scotland Exchange itself was a 1974 amalgamation of two earlier constituencies. This was a result of the long-term decline in the population of inner city Liverpool in the latter part of the twentieth century.

Members of Parliament

Election results

Elections in the 1950s

Elections in the 1960s

Elections in the 1970s

References

Sources 
 Boundaries of Parliamentary Constituencies 1885-1972, compiled and edited by F.W.S. Craig (Parliamentary Reference Publications 1972)
 British Parliamentary Constituencies: A Statistical Compendium, by Ivor Crewe and Anthony Fox (Faber and Faber 1984)
 British Parliamentary Election Results 1950-1973, compiled and edited by F.W.S. Craig (Parliamentary Research Services 1983)
 Who's Who of British Members of Parliament, Volume IV 1945-1979, edited by M. Stenton and S. Lees (Harvester Press 1981)

Parliamentary constituencies in North West England (historic)
Toxteth
Constituencies of the Parliament of the United Kingdom established in 1950
Constituencies of the Parliament of the United Kingdom disestablished in 1983
Toxteth